Silene undulata (—"white ways/paths", also known as Silene capensis, and African dream root) is a plant native to the Eastern Cape of South Africa.

Cultivation
In cultivation, S. undulata is an easily grown, but moisture hungry herb.  It is tolerant of extreme heat, >, and moderate cold, . A moisture retentive seedbed is essential. The fragrant flowers open at night and close in the day. It is a biennial to short lived perennial and the root can be harvested after the second year.

Uses
Silene undulata is regarded by the Xhosa people as a sacred plant. Its root is traditionally used to induce vivid (and according to the Xhosa, prophetic) lucid dreams during the initiation process of shamans, classifying it a naturally occurring oneirogen similar to the more well-known dream herb Calea zacatechichi.

References

Further reading
 Jean-Francois Sobiecki: Psychoactive Spiritual Medicines and Healing Dynamics in the Initiation Process of Southern Bantu Diviners. In: Journal of Psychoactive Drugs. 44, 2012, S. 216–223, .
 Watt, J.M. & Breyer-Brandwijk, M.J. 1962. The medicinal and poisonous plants of southern and eastern Africa. Second edition. Edinburgh: E. & S. Livingstone.

External links

Entheogens
Herbal and fungal hallucinogens
Oneirogens
undulata